Jennifer Tse Ting-Ting (born 7 September 1982) is a Hong Kong actress.

Biography
Born on 7 September 1982 in Hong Kong, She is the daughter of Patrick Tse and Deborah Lee. Her elder brother is Nicholas Tse.

During her career, she is best known for her role in Bruce Lee, My Brother (2010) when she played Pearl Tso, the love interest of Bruce Lee (as portrayed by Aarif Lee) and in the 2012 film Naked Soldier when she played a daughter of policeman who was kidnapped and trained as an assassin.

In Siddharta (2014) she played Prince Siddhartha Gautama's wife, Yaśodharā, opposite Ray Lui (who plays Buddha).

She gained a bachelor's degree in psychology from the University of British Columbia.

Filmography 
Bruce Lee, My Brother (2010)
Hong Kong Ghost Stories (2011)
Naked Soldier (2012)
 Siddhartha (2014) - Yasodharā
Knock Knock! Who's There? (有客到) (2015)
Europe Raiders (2018)

Personal life
Tse and actor Andy On dated from 2009 to 2013. She dated TV producer Sean Lee-Davies from 2014 to 2015. 

By 3 June 2019, Tse had a baby daughter who was 100 days old, however, it is not known who the father was. It is later known on 21 February 2020 that her daughter was named Sara on her first birthday.

References

External links
 
 Jennifer Tse at lovehkfilm.com

1982 births
Living people
Hong Kong film actresses
Hong Kong female models
Hong Kong television actresses
University of British Columbia alumni
Naturalized citizens of Canada
Hong Kong emigrants to Canada